Paul Douglas Westphal (November 30, 1950 – January 2, 2021) was an American basketball player, head coach, and commentator.

Westphal played in the National Basketball Association (NBA) from 1972 to 1984. Playing the guard position, he won an NBA championship with the Boston Celtics in 1974. Westphal played in the NBA Finals again in 1976 as a member of the Phoenix Suns. His NBA career also included stints with the Seattle SuperSonics and the New York Knicks. In addition to being a five-time All-Star selection, Westphal earned three All-NBA First Team selections and one Second Team honor.

After his playing career ended, Westphal  coached  for Southwestern Baptist Bible College (now Arizona Christian University), Grand Canyon University, and Pepperdine University, and served also as head coach of the Phoenix Suns, Seattle SuperSonics, and Sacramento Kings in the NBA. Westphal coached the Suns to the NBA Finals in 1993.

In 2019, Westphal was inducted into the Naismith Basketball Hall of Fame.

Early life

Born in Torrance, California, Westphal went to Aviation High School in Redondo Beach from 1966 to 1969. He attended the University of Southern California in Los Angeles and played college basketball for the Trojans at guard.

USC had a  record in 1971, setting a Trojans record for winning percentage.  In that era, the Pac-8 Conference sent only one team (champion UCLA) to the 25-team NCAA tournament and none to the 16-team National Invitation Tournament (NIT).

Westphal was an All-American team captain in 1972. Playing for USC from 1970 to 1972, he averaged 16.9 points per game and led the Trojans with 20.3 points per game in 1972.

Playing career

Boston Celtics (1972–1975) 
The Boston Celtics selected Westphal tenth overall in the 1972 NBA draft. After three seasons in Boston, including a championship in 1974, the Celtics traded Westphal and two second round draft picks to the Phoenix Suns for Charlie Scott.

Phoenix Suns (1975–1980) 
In his first season with in Phoenix, Westphal helped the Suns reach their first NBA Finals, against the Celtics. In Game 5 of that series, often called "the greatest game ever played" in NBA history, he made several critical plays that pushed the game into triple overtime before Boston prevailed. Notably, Westphal exploited a loophole within NBA rules that effectively allowed the Suns to cede a point to get the ball at half-court with two seconds remaining at the end of the second overtime; the Suns tied the game thanks to the loophole. 

Westphal was sixth in the NBA in scoring average for the  season at 25.2 points per game, and was also the first NBA All-Star Weekend H-O-R-S-E Competition champion. The following season, he was seventh in scoring average with 24.0 points per game.

Seattle Supersonics (1980–1981) 
After the 1979–80 season in early June, the Suns traded Westphal to the Seattle SuperSonics for Dennis Johnson, He played 36 games in the 1980–81 season, limited by a stress fracture in his right foot. He was a free agent after the season, but Seattle held the right of first refusal. He was unable to come to terms with the Sonics.

New York Knicks (1982–1983) 
After missing most of the 1981–82 season, Westphal signed with the New York Knicks in late February 1982 after Seattle declined to match the offer. He was named the NBA Comeback Player of the Year in 1982–83, when he averaged 10 points and 5.5 assists and helped the Knicks qualify for the playoffs.

Return to Phoenix (1983–1984) 
He signed a two-year contract with Phoenix in September 1983, and the Suns waived him in October 1984.

In his NBA career, Westphal scored a total of 12,809 points for an average of 15.6 points per game, with 3,591 assists for an average of 4.4 assists per game. He also had 1,580 rebounds, for an average of 1.9 per game. Westphal was a five-time All-Star, a three-time All-NBA first team selection, and a one-time second team All-NBA selection. He is Phoenix's fifth all-time leading scorer (9,564), averaging 20.6 points in six seasons (1975–80, 1983–84). His No. 44 was retired by the Suns, and he is a member of their Ring of Honor. Westphal was also inducted into the Naismith Basketball Hall of Fame as a player on September 6, 2019.

Coaching career

Westphal's coaching career started in 1985 at Southwestern Baptist Bible College (now Arizona Christian University), located in Phoenix. After compiling a 21–9 record in his lone season there, he moved on to Grand Canyon College, also in Phoenix, and after two seasons led them to the NAIA national title in 1988.

In 1988, after three years in the college ranks, Westphal became an assistant coach with the Phoenix Suns under head coach Cotton Fitzsimmons, and in 1992, he succeeded Fitzsimmons as head coach of the Suns. With players such as Kevin Johnson, Dan Majerle, rookie Richard Dumas, Charles Barkley, and Danny Ainge, the Suns made it to the NBA Finals in Westphal's first season as a coach, but lost to the Chicago Bulls in six games. While the Suns made the playoffs during each of Westphal's seasons as coach, they did not return to the Finals, and Westphal was let go during the 1995–96 season. He served as an assistant coach for a high school team in Arizona for two years before he returned to the NBA as a coach with the SuperSonics for the 1998–99 season. He coached in Seattle until he was fired 15 games into the 2000–01 season.

Westphal returned to the college ranks in April 2001 at Pepperdine University. In his first season, Westphal led the Waves to a 22–9 record and tied the nationally ranked Gonzaga Bulldogs for the WCC title. The team received an at-large berth to the NCAA tournament, but lost 83–74 to Wake Forest in the first round, played at ARCO Arena in Sacramento. This was the only postseason berth during the rest of Westphal's five-year tenure and he finished with an overall record of 74–72. After a 7–20 season in 2005–06, Westphal was fired on March 15, 2006.

On June 28, 2007, the Dallas Mavericks announced they had hired Westphal as an assistant coach under head coach Avery Johnson. When Johnson was replaced by Rick Carlisle, Westphal left coaching to become executive vice-president of basketball operations (under Donnie Nelson) for the Mavericks in October 2008. On June 10, 2009, Westphal was named head coach of the Sacramento Kings. Westphal was fired from the Kings on January 5, 2012.

For the 2014–15 season, Westphal was hired by the Brooklyn Nets as an assistant to new head coach Lionel Hollins. Hollins had previously served as Westphal's assistant coach in Phoenix. When the Nets fired Hollins in January 2016, Westphal left the team.

Broadcasting career 
Westphal also worked as a studio analyst for Fox Sports Net West/Prime Ticket for Los Angeles Clippers and Los Angeles Lakers games, first joining them during the Clippers' run in the 2006 NBA Playoffs.

Personal life
Westphal was married to Cindy Westphal and they had two children together. He was a Christian. 

In August 2020, ESPN reported that he was diagnosed with brain cancer which he succumbed to in Scottsdale, Arizona on January 2, 2021, at age 70.

Head coaching record

NBA

|-
| style="text-align:left;"|Phoenix
| style="text-align:left;"|
| 82||62||20|||| style="text-align:center;"|1st in Pacific||24||13||11||
| style="text-align:center;"|Lost in NBA Finals
|-
| style="text-align:left;"|Phoenix
| style="text-align:left;"|
| 82||56||26|||| style="text-align:center;"|2nd in Pacific||10||6||4||
| style="text-align:center;"|Lost in Conference semifinals
|-
| style="text-align:left;"|Phoenix
| style="text-align:left;"|
| 82||59||23|||| style="text-align:center;"|1st in Pacific||10||6||4||
| style="text-align:center;"|Lost in Conference semifinals
|-
| style="text-align:left;"|Phoenix
| style="text-align:left;"|
| 33||14||19|||| style="text-align:center;"|(fired)||—||—||—||—
| style="text-align:center;"|—
|-
| style="text-align:left;"|Seattle
| style="text-align:left;"|
| 50||25||25|||| style="text-align:center;"|5th in Pacific||—||—||—||—
| style="text-align:center;"|Missed playoffs
|-
| style="text-align:left;"|Seattle
| style="text-align:left;"|
| 82||45||37|||| style="text-align:center;"|4th in Pacific||5||2||3||
| style="text-align:center;"|Lost in first round
|-
| style="text-align:left;"|Seattle
| style="text-align:left;"|
| 15||6||9|||| style="text-align:center;"|(fired)||—||—||—||—
| style="text-align:center;"|—
|-
| style="text-align:left;"|Sacramento
| style="text-align:left;"|
| 82||25||57|||| style="text-align:center;"|5th in Pacific||—||—||—||—
| style="text-align:center;"|Missed playoffs
|-
| style="text-align:left;"|Sacramento
| style="text-align:left;"|
| 82||24||58|||| style="text-align:center;"|5th in Pacific||—||—||—||—
| style="text-align:center;"|Missed playoffs
|-
| style="text-align:left;"|Sacramento
| style="text-align:left;"|
| 7||2||5|||| style="text-align:center;"|(fired)||—||—||—||—
| style="text-align:center;"|—
|-class="sortbottom"
| style="text-align:center;" colspan="2"|Career
| 597||318||279|||| ||49||27||22||||

College
Sources:

References

External links

 Paul Westphal's bio on Phoenix Suns' website
 Paul Westphal's official bio on NBA.com

1950 births
2021 deaths
All-American college men's basketball players
American Christians
American men's basketball coaches
American men's basketball players
American television sports announcers
Basketball coaches from California
Basketball players at the 1971 Pan American Games
Basketball players from Torrance, California
Boston Celtics draft picks
Boston Celtics players
Brooklyn Nets assistant coaches
College basketball announcers in the United States
College men's basketball head coaches in the United States
Dallas Mavericks assistant coaches
Deaths from brain cancer in the United States
Grand Canyon Antelopes men's basketball coaches
Naismith Memorial Basketball Hall of Fame inductees
National Basketball Association All-Stars
National Basketball Association players with retired numbers
New York Knicks players
Pan American Games competitors for the United States
Pepperdine Waves men's basketball coaches
Phoenix Suns assistant coaches
Phoenix Suns head coaches
Phoenix Suns players
Point guards
Sacramento Kings head coaches
Seattle SuperSonics head coaches
Seattle SuperSonics players
Shooting guards
Sportspeople from Redondo Beach, California
USC Trojans men's basketball players